Miiesha is an Australian singer-songwriter from the Aboriginal community of Woorabinda, Queensland. She was the recipient of New Talent of the Year at the 2020 National Indigenous Music Awards and won the ARIA Award for Best Soul/R&B Release at the 2020 ARIA Music Awards.

Early life and education
Miiesha is an Aṉangu/Torres Strait Islander woman, and has been singing for her community since the age of 8 and has since been developing her songwriting as a teenager. Miiesha is inspired by the sounds of RnB, gospel and soul, and the power of spoken word poetry.

Career

2019–2020: Nyaaringu
Miiesha made her debut single "Black Privilege" in June 2019. In May 2020, Miiesha released her debut album titled, Nyaaringu; a project of 9 songs tied together through the common themes of her life, her community and her people. Her late Grandmother's interludes provide a thread between the tracks, highlighting the passing down of knowledge from Elders through the generations. the album peaked at number 28 on the ARIA Charts and won the ARIA Award for Best Soul/R&B Release at the 2020 ARIA Music Awards.

2021-present: Smoke & Mirrors
On 14 May 2021, Miiesha released "Damaged", which Miiesha said is her "most personal song yet". It won Song of the Year at the National Indigenous Music Awards 2021.

On 16 July 2021, Miiesha released "Made for Silence".

In September 2021, Miiesha announced a double-EP project titled Smoke & Mirrors, with the first part scheduled for release in November 2021. In a press release, the EPs explore "broken family dynamics, searching for love and healing from two perspectives", with the first centred around "survival" and the second on "looking back and understanding". The single "Still Dream" was released on 4 March 2022 from the forthcoming EP Mirrors. On 3 June 2022, Smoke & Mirrors was released on CD and LP, combining both EPs.

Discography

Studio albums

Extended plays

Singles

As lead artist

As featured artist

Awards and nominations

APRA Awards
The APRA Awards are several award ceremonies run in Australia by the Australasian Performing Right Association (APRA) to recognise composing and song writing skills, sales and airplay performance by its members annually. 

! 
|-
! scope="row" rowspan="2"| 2021
| Miiesha Young  Miiesha
| Breakthrough Songwriter of the Year
| rowspan="2"  
| rowspan="2"| 
|-
| "Twisting Words"
| Most Performed R&B / Soul Work
|-
! scope="row" rowspan="1"| 2021
| "Made for Silence"
| Most Performed R&B / Soul Work
| 
| rowspan="1"| 
|-
|}

ARIA Music Awards
The ARIA Music Awards is an annual awards ceremony that recognises excellence, innovation, and achievement across all genres of Australian music. As of 2020, Miiesha has received 5 nominations and Best Soul/R&B Release.

! 
|-
! scope="row" rowspan="5"| 2020
| rowspan="3"| Nyaaringu 
| Best Female Artist 
| 
| rowspan="5"| 
|-
| Best Soul/R&B Release
| 
|-
| Breakthrough Artist
| rowspan="4" 
|-
| rowspan="2"| IAMMXO ( Mohamed Komba) for Nyaaringu
| Producer of the Year
|-
| Engineer of the Year
|}

Australian Music Prize
The Australian Music Prize (the AMP) is an annual award of $30,000 given to an Australian band or solo artist in recognition of the merit of an album released during the year of award. They commenced in 2005.

! 
|-
! 2020
| Nyaaringu
| Album of the Year
| 
| 
|}

J Awards
The J Awards are an annual series of Australian music awards that were established by the Australian Broadcasting Corporation's youth-focused radio station Triple J. They commenced in 2005.

! 
|-
! scope="row"| 2020
| Nyaaringu 
| Australian Album of the Year
| 
| 
|}

National Indigenous Music Awards
The National Indigenous Music Awards recognise excellence, innovation and leadership among Aboriginal and Torres Strait Islander musicians from throughout Australia. They commenced in 2004.

! 
|-
! scope="row" rowspan="3"| 2020
| Herself
| New Talent of the Year
| 
| rowspan="3"| 
|-
| Nyaaringu
| Album of the Year
| rowspan="2" 
|-
| "Drowning"
| Film Clip of the Year
|-
! scope="row" rowspan="2"| 2021
| Herself
| Artist of the Year
| 
| rowspan="2"| 
|-
| "Damaged"
| Song of the Year
| 
|-
| rowspan="1"| 2022
| "Made for Silence"
| Song of the Year
| 
| 
|-
|}

National Live Music Awards
The National Live Music Awards (NLMAs) are a broad recognition of Australia's diverse live industry, celebrating the success of the Australian live scene. The awards commenced in 2016.

! 
|-
! scope="row"| 2020
| Herself
| Queensland Act Voice of the Year
| 
| 
|}

Queensland Music Awards
The Queensland Music Awards (previously known as Q Song Awards) are annual awards celebrating Queensland, Australia's brightest emerging artists and established legends. They commenced in 2006.

 (wins only)
! 
|-
! scope="row" rowspan="3" | 2021
| rowspan="3"| "Twisting Words"
| Indigenous Award
| 
| rowspan="3"| 
|-
| Soul / Funk / R&B Award
| 
|-
| Remote Award
| 
|-
! scope="row"| 2022
| Made for Silence
| Soul / Funk / R&B Award
| 
| 
|}

Rolling Stone Australia Awards
The Rolling Stone Australia Awards are awarded annually in January or February by the Australian edition of Rolling Stone magazine for outstanding contributions to popular culture in the previous year.

! 
|-
| 2021
| Miiesha
| Best New Artist
| 
| 
|-

References

21st-century Australian women singers
21st-century Australian singers
ARIA Award winners
Australian contemporary R&B singers
Australian women pop singers
Australian women singer-songwriters
Indigenous Australian musicians
Living people
Year of birth missing (living people)